Penicillium brasiliense is a fungus species of the genus of Penicillium.

See also
List of Penicillium species

References

brasiliense
Fungi described in 1930
Taxa named by Charles Thom